Chichakuri (Quechua chichaku, meaning chigoe flea (Tunga penetrans), -(i)ri an Aymara suffix; Hispanicized spelling Chichacori) is an archaeological site in Peru consisting of stone tombs (chullpa), walls, houses and squares. The place was declared a National Cultural Heritage by Resolución Directoral Nacional No. 296/INC-2003 by the National Institute of Culture on May 16, 2003.

References 

Archaeological sites in Peru
Archaeological sites in Puno Region
Tombs in Peru